Ladies and Gentlemen, The Fabulous Stains is a 1982 teen musical drama film about three teenage girls, played by Diane Lane, Laura Dern and Marin Kanter, who start a punk band. The film also features acting roles by real-life punk musicians including Steve Jones and Paul Cook of the Sex Pistols, Paul Simonon from the Clash, and Vince Welnick and Fee Waybill from the Tubes.

The Stains are depicted suffering the derision of male audiences and peers, but their dedication—and the fiery public persona of lead singer Corinne Burns—gains them a strong female fan base that ultimately eclipses their antagonists. The last scene is a triumphant MTV-style professional music video, which indicates the band finally achieved rock stardom.

Director Lou Adler and screenwriter Nancy Dowd (aided by Caroline Coon) disagreed starkly on the film's finale, and it was put on hold for two years until it was capped by Adler with the music video. Although it failed to make any commercial headway with its initial release in late 1982, the film became a cult favorite on 1980s cable television, particularly the late-night series Night Flight. Its reputation grew, and it is considered an influence on the feminist riot grrl movement. The film continues to be celebrated at film festivals and specialty theaters.

Plot
Corinne Burns is a 17-year-old girl whose mother has recently died from lung cancer. Working in a fast food restaurant to help support herself and her younger sister, Corinne is interviewed by a local television station for a story about her town's dwindling economy amidst the Early 1980s recession. During the interview, Corinne becomes angry and belligerent towards the reporter, eventually lashing out at her overbearing and condescending boss and getting fired. The segment resonates with the station's teenage viewers, who see Corinne as a kindred spirit. The station does a follow-up interview, which primarily consists of Corinne acting flippant and making sarcastic remarks to the journalist. However, she does manage to slip in a plug for her garage band "The Stains", which consists of her, her sister Tracy, and their cousin Jessica.

Emboldened by appearing on television, Corinne attends a concert put on by small-time promoter Lawnboy, featuring the washed-up metal band the Metal Corpses and their opening act, an up-and-coming punk band called the Looters. Eager to end hostilities between the jaded Metal Corpses and the hedonistic Looters, Lawnboy signs the Stains without having heard them perform. Corinne and the Stains join the tour, witnessing firsthand the bands' animosity towards one another, largely the result of the conflict between the aging Lou, the frontman for the Metal Corpses, and Billy, the Looters' volatile lead singer.

At their first show, the Stains prove to be completely inept as a band: Neither Jessica nor Tracy can play instruments, and Corinne sings in an off-key monotone. The audience reacts angrily, prompting Corinne to lash out at them for a variety of real and perceived faults. After the show, the Metal Corpses' guitar player Jerry is found dead in the bathroom, and the band leaves the tour. Lawnboy makes the Looters the new headliners with the Stains as their opening act. A dissatisfied Billy asks Lawnboy to replace the Stains as soon as possible.

At their next show, Corinne debuts a new, more extreme punk look, with hair dyed to resemble a skunk and a see-through blouse worn over a pair of bikini briefs. Announcing that she "never puts out", she goes on another tirade, grabbing more media attention. While male journalists focus on Corinne's antisocial attitude and the band's lack of talent, female journalists understand Corinne's rants as calls for female empowerment and hail the Stains as a new voice of feminism. Soon the Stains become a national sensation, with girls all over the country emulating Corinne in every way possible, from dyeing their hair to running away from home.

During a tour stop at a motel, Billy attempts to seduce Corinne by sharing his feelings about the band and his alleged private shame of illiteracy. Over the course of their conversation, Billy recites the lyrics to a song, "Join the Professionals" which sums up his most personal feelings about the state of the world. At their next stop, the band is met by Lawnboy's agent, Dave Robell, with the intended replacement act for the Stains (Black Randy and the Metrosquad). Although Billy tells Corinne that he only wanted her replaced early on in the tour, Corinne lashes out at him, and at the Stains' next show, they play a cover version of Billy's song, which skyrockets the band to even further stardom. With Robell's encouragement, Corinne signs a new contract, cutting Lawnboy out of any royalties and making the Stains the new headliners of the tour.

At the next show, Billy delivers a speech to the crowd about how the Stains have betrayed their "never put out" mantra by becoming corporate sell outs. When the Stains come onstage, the fans riot, and Corinne is attacked by a girl with a tube of hair dye. The tour becomes a financial disaster and Robell cancels the Stains' contract. Corinne responds by threatening him with a bottle opener and taking the money he's been withholding from her; Corinne then presents it to Lawnboy as an apology.

The next morning, Corinne appears on television, where a belligerent male journalist chastises her for having been a poor role model to her fans. Billy apologizes for ruining Corinne's career and asks her to come back as the Looters' opening act. Corinne refuses; as she wanders the streets, she overhears a radio broadcast identifying the Stains' first song as a hit record. Some time in the future, the Stains make their MTV debut, having become a successful act on Lawnboy's new record label.

Cast 
The film features several punk rock musicians in acting roles: Steve Jones and Paul Cook of the Sex Pistols, Paul Simonon from the Clash, and Vince Welnick and Fee Waybill from the Tubes. Los Angeles punk rocker Black Randy from Black Randy and the Metrosquad makes an appearance as himself and as "Mexican Randy".

Musician Barry Ford, formerly of the reggae band Merger, plays the promoter nicknamed Lawnboy. Ford composed the majority of the soundtrack including the title song "All Washed Up", which features Jones, Cook, and Simonon. The song "Join the Professionals" was written and previously recorded by Jones and Cook's post-Pistols band, the Professionals.

The complete cast includes:
 Diane Lane as Corinne Burns
 Laura Dern as Jessica McNeil
 Marin Kanter as Tracy Burns
 Christine Lahti as Aunt Linda
 Janet Wright as Aunt Linda's friend Brenda
 Peter Donat as Harley Dennis
 David Clennon as Dave Robell, the agent
 Barry Ford as Lawnboy
 Ray Winstone as Billy, vocalist for The Looters
 Paul Simonon as Johnny, bassist for The Looters
 Steve Jones as Steve, guitarist for The Looters
 Paul Cook as Danny, drummer for The Looters
 Fee Waybill as Lou Corpse, vocalist for The Metal Corpses
 Vince Welnick as Jerry Jervey, guitarist for The Metal Corpses

There are also brief appearances by Elizabeth Daily as a hotel maid, and Brent Spiner.

Production 
The original project had the working title All Washed Up. Once underway, the film was directed by music business tycoon Lou Adler for Paramount Pictures. The script was written by Nancy Dowd, who had won the Best Screenplay Academy Award for Coming Home. The movie was produced by Joe Roth, who would later become chairman of Walt Disney Studios.

In the mid-1970s, Caroline Coon was working as a Melody Maker music journalist and had earned a reputation as an early proponent of punk rock. Dowd, who was interested in writing a script about the new movement, contacted her and made an exploratory visit to London. Coon told Dowd that feminism was "the next big thing to come in punk rock", and the two began collaborating on the storyline to a film.

On his KLOS radio show in 2018, Steve Jones talked with Fee Waybill  about how filming began in the winter of 1980 in Vancouver, Canada. Waybill recalled a scene that required Ray Winstone to hit him in the eye—which he did, accidentally, at full force. With his eye visibly swelling, Waybill completed the scene and it was kept in the final cut of the film.

Adler and Dowd had competing visions for the film right from the start. It was the ending, however, that caused them to collide. The original storyline was supposed to end with girls across the UK proudly emulating the Stains, but Coon says this inspirational concept was "muted by its male director". Tensions rose as Adler demanded a rewrite, and ultimately Coon and Dowd walked off the set for good. Dowd removed her name from the script, and is credited under the pseudonym "Rob Morton" in the final cut. The film was shelved without an ending for two years, until Adler tacked on an exuberant Stains music video that gave the impression that the band had achieved stardom. The film fared poorly among test audiences and did not get a general release.

Release 
The film was screened in a tiny number of theaters in October 1982, and earned a box office gross just over US$25,000. Eventually the film made its way to cable television. Night Flight, the weekend counter-culture programming block on USA Network, began regularly airing the film, and it found an audience. (This was in 1984, and at the time the network was part-owned by Paramount.) Off the positive reception of the airings, subdistributor Films Inc. licensed the film from Paramount, and it eventually made its way to the art house circuit.

The film's next theatrical engagements included showings at Film Forum in New York City on Wednesday, March 6, 1985, in Chicago in April 1985, in Atlanta and Los Angeles in July 1985, and at the Theater of the Living Arts in Philadelphia from Friday, August 23 to Saturday, August 24, 1985. The film continues to have screenings in various theaters through the present day.

Rhino Home Video released a DVD on September 16, 2008. The disc featured bonus commentary tracks, one from Adler and a second with both Lane and Dern together.

ViaVision/Imprint released an extra feature packed Special Edition bluray in November 2022 in Australia. No less than 3 audio commentaries are included on the disc including the one with actors Diane Lane and Laura Dern. Lots of other features are included too. The release works in most bluray players as it is not region locked.

Reception 
Ladies and Gentlemen, The Fabulous Stains holds a rating of 64% from 11 reviews on Rotten Tomatoes.

Influence 
Although it was a little-known obscurity for many years, it has developed a cult film status that continues to grow. Repertory screenings of the film, once a rarity, have grown more frequent in recent years.

The film predated the riot grrl scene of the 1990s, and among its early fans were members of Bikini Kill and Bratmobile. Other fans of the film include writer/podcaster Jake Fogelnest, and underground filmmaker Sarah Jacobson, as well as musician/actress Kate Nash who revealed in a web interview that she dyed her hair to match Corinne's. In 2000, Jacobson directed, with Sam Green, a short documentary on the film for the IFC television show Split Screen.

References

External links 
 
 
 Film website at Internet Archive

1982 films
1982 comedy-drama films
1982 independent films
1980s musical comedy-drama films
American independent films
American musical comedy-drama films
American rock music films
Films directed by Lou Adler
Films produced by Joe Roth
Paramount Pictures films
Punk films
Riot grrrl films
American female buddy films
1980s English-language films
1980s female buddy films
Films about girl groups
1980s American films
Proto-riot grrrl bands